is a private junior college in Isesaki, Gunma, Japan. The College was opened in 2006, and is affiliated with the Tokyo University of Social Welfare.

Courses available
The university offers courses in education, psychology, and social welfare, and the junior college offers courses in child studies.

Academic departments 
Department of Child Studies

See also
 Tokyo University of Social Welfare

External links
 Official website 

Private universities and colleges in Japan
Japanese junior colleges
Universities and colleges in Gunma Prefecture
Educational institutions established in 2006
2006 establishments in Japan